= Jhalandhar Araiyan, Pakistan =

Village in Pakistan

Jhalandhar Araiyan
- Village
- Location of Jhalandhar Araiyan in Punjab Jhalandhar Araiyan (Pakistan) Jhalandhar Araiyan (South Asia) Jhalandhar Araiyan (Earth)
- Coordinates: 31.202895°N 72.892311°E
- Country: Pakistan
- Province: (Punjab, Pakistan) Punjab
- District: Faisalabad
- Time zone: UTC+5 (PKT)
- Postal code: 37360

Jhalandhar Araiyan (Urdu جالندھر آرائیاں ) is a village located 42 km from Faisalabad, in Punjab, Pakistan. It has an elevation of 176 meters above sea level. The full name of the village is Chak No. 267 RB Jhalandhar Araiyan. The total population of the village is 12,000+ in 1,500 households. Facilities like electricity, gas, telephone, water, cable, schools, and Internet are available. Residents are all Punjabi, as is their language. It has a central hospital and a mosque named “Bilal Masjid”. The main source of income for the people is farming and cultivation. There are fields of sugarcane, wheat, rice, and a poultry farm as well.
